Marble Canyon Airport  is a privately owned, public-use airport located  south west of the Central business district of Marble Canyon, in Coconino County, Arizona, United States.

Facilities and aircraft 
It has one runway: 3/21 is 3,715 by 35 feet (1,132 x 11 m) with an asphalt surface.

For the 12-month period ending April 18, 2010, the airport had 2,100 general aviation aircraft operations, an average of 6 per day. At that time there was 1 aircraft based at this airport, a single-engine.

References

External links 

 

Airports in Coconino County, Arizona